Sir Arthur William Peterson KCB MVO (22 May 1916 - 8 May 1986) was a British civil servant who served as Permanent Under-Secretary of State at the Home Office. As such he was the senior civil servant and permanent head of the Home Office, one of the most senior civil service roles in government. He also pioneered the use of psychologists in British prisons.

Career
Born in Calcutta, Peterson was educated at Shrewsbury School and Merton College, Oxford. He was the younger brother of Alec Peterson, the educational reformer.

Peterson joined the civil service in 1938. During the First World War, he served in the Ministry of Home Security. He served as principal private secretary to the Home Secretary, from 1946 to 1949. In 1957, Peterson was a special adviser to Rab Butler, whilst Butler was Home Secretary. Peterson became a specialist on the management of prisons and was appointed Chairman of the Prison Commission. He introduced the first psychologists to British prisons.

Peterson went on to serve as Permanent Under-Secretary of State at the Home Office from 1972 to 1977. In that role, he suggested alterations to arrangements for Armistice Day – or even cancelling it altogether. In 1975, he also provided evidence to the United Kingdom Prison Services Committee and warned members of parliament about what activities prisoners in UK prisons might get involved in, without strict controls. The evidence and papers he provided to members of parliament are held in the National Archives.

He was Chairman of the British Refugee Council from 1981 to 1986.

Honours 

 Member of the Royal Victorian Order, 1953
 Companion of the Order of the Bath, 1963
 Knight Commander of the Order of the Bath, 1973

Notes

References 

1916 births
1986 deaths
People from Kolkata
People educated at Shrewsbury School
Alumni of Merton College, Oxford
British civil servants
British people in colonial India
Permanent Under-Secretaries of State for the Home Department